A Letter From Death Row is a 1998 psychological thriller film directed by Marvin Baker and Bret Michaels, lead singer of the hard rock band Poison. Bret Michaels also wrote the film and starred in it. The film was released by Sheen Michaels Entertainment, a company created by Bret Michaels and actor Charlie Sheen. The film was produced by Shane Stanley and also stars Martin Sheen, Charlie Sheen, and Kristi Gibson, who was Michaels' girlfriend at the time.

The prison scenes were filmed on location in the Tennessee State Prison, with real inmates used as extras.

Plot summary
Convicted killer Michael Raine is on death row. He is either guilty of killing his girlfriend or a victim of a conspiracy to frame him for a crime he didn't commit. As the story unfolds Jessica Foster, an assistant to the Governor of Tennessee begins to interview Raine while on death row, claiming that she's writing a book about the inmates. Through various circumstances, Raine puts two and two together and builds a case that he believes can prove his innocence. Ms. Foster is the only one on the 'outside" who can give Raine a voice, but is she working for those who framed him? As time draws near to the date of his execution, in his most desperate hour Raine finds the missing pieces to the puzzle to prove his innocence, but is it too late?

Soundtrack
Bret Michaels also recorded and released the soundtrack to the movie in the same year. Max T. Barnes worked as an engineer on the project.

Documentary
A documentary was released in 2000 titled "High Tension, Low Budget (The Making of a Letter from Death Row)" and is included as a special extra bonus on DVD versions released outside the U.S. The extra includes the making of the movie, featuring in depth interviews with cast and crew and various other clips of Bret Michaels in the 1990s leading up to the movie's release.

References

External links
 

1998 films
1990s psychological thriller films
American thriller films
1990s English-language films
1990s American films